In the 10th edition of Systema Naturae, Carl Linnaeus described the Amphibia as:
Animals that are distinguished by a body cold and generally naked; stern and expressive countenance; harsh voice; mostly lurid color; filthy odor; a few are furnished with a horrid poison; all have cartilaginous bones, slow circulation, exquisite sight and hearing, large pulmonary vessels, lobate liver, oblong thick stomach, and cystic, hepatic, and pancreatic ducts: they are deficient in diaphragm, do not transpire (sweat), can live a long time without food, are tenatious of life, and have the power of reproducing parts which have been destroyed or lost; some undergo a metamorphosis; some cast (shed) their skin; some appear to live promiscuously on land or in the water, and some are torpid during the winter.

Linnaean characteristics
Heart: 1 auricle, 1 ventricle. Cold, dark red blood
Lungs: breathes uncertainly
Jaw: incumbent
Penis: (frequently) double
Eggs: (usually) membranaceous
Organs of Sense: tongue, nostrils, eyes, ears
Covering: a naked skin
Supports: various, in some none. Creeps in warm places and hisses

Linnaeus often regarded reptiles within the amphibian class because living in Sweden, he often noticed that the local reptiles (examples include the common adder and grass snake) would hunt and be active in the water.

In the 10th edition of Systema Naturae, Linnaeus included several species of fishes (that do not belong the superclass Osteichthyes) into the amphibian class. It was not until later on that he would merge them into the Fish class and give them their own new order "Chondropterygious", defining them as species with cartilaginous gills.

Linnaeus divided the amphibians based upon the limb structures and the way they breathed.

Reptiles 

 Testudo (turtles & tortoises)
Testudo mydas – Green sea turtle
Testudo caretta – Loggerhead sea turtle
Testudo orbicularis & Testudo lutaria – European pond turtle
Testudo scabra – Spot-legged turtle
Testudo graeca & Testudo pusilla – Spur-thighed tortoise
Testudo carolina & Testudo carinata – Eastern box turtle
Testudo geometrica – Geometric tortoise
Testudo serpentina – Common snapping turtle

 Draco (gliding lizards)
Draco volans – Draco volans, Flying Dragon

 Lacerta (terrestrial lizards, salamanders, & crocodilians)
Lacerta crocodilus – Caiman crocodilus, Spectacled Caiman
Lacerta caudiverbera – [fictitious]
Lacerta superciliosa – Uranoscodon superciliosa
Lacerta scutata – Lyriocephalus scutatus
Lacerta monitor – [rejected]
Lacerta principalis – Carolina Anole<ref>{{EOL |795869 |Anolis carolinensis Voigt, 1832'}}</ref>Lacerta bicarinata – Neusticurus bicarinatusLacerta palustris, Lacerta vulgaris, & Lacerta aquatica – Lissotriton vulgaris, Smooth newtLacerta cordylus – Cordylus cordylusLacerta stellio – Laudakia stellioLacerta mauritanica – Tarentola mauritanica, European common geckoLacerta azurea – Uracentron azureumLacerta turcica – Hemidactylus turcicus, Mediterranean house geckoLacerta ameiva – Ameiva ameiva, Giant AmeivaLacerta agilis – Lacerta agilis, Sand LizardLacerta algira – Psammodromus algirus, Large PsammodromusLacerta seps – Tetradactylus sepsLacerta angulata – Alopoglossus angulatusLacerta chamaeleon – Chamaeleo chamaeleon, Common chameleonLacerta salamandra – Fire salamanderLacerta gecko – Gekko gecko, Tokay geckoLacerta scincus – Scincus scincus, SandfishLacerta hispida – Agama hispidaLacerta orbicularis – Phrynosoma orbiculare, Mexican plateau horned lizardLacerta basiliscus – Basiliscus basiliscus, Common basiliskLacerta iguana – Iguana iguana, Green iguanaLacerta calotes – Calotes calotes, Common green forest lizardLacerta agama – Agama agama, Rock AgamaLacerta umbra – Plica umbraLacerta plica – Plica plicaLacerta marmorata – Polychrus marmoratusLacerta bullaris – Jamaican giant anoleLacerta strumosa – [nomen oblitum] for Anolis lineatusDaudin, 1802Lacerta teguixin – Tupinambis teguixin, Gold teguLacerta aurataLacerta punctata – Riopa punctataLacerta lemniscata – Cnemidophorus lemniscatus, Rainbow WhiptailLacerta fasciata – Plestiodon fasciatus, Five-lined skinkLacerta lineata – Gymnophthalmus lineatusLacerta chalcides – Chalcides chalcides, Three-toed skinkLacerta anguina – Chamaesaura anguina, Cape grass lizard

 Rana (frogs & toads)Rana pipa – Pipa pipa, Suriname ToadRana bufo, Rana rubeta, & Rana ventricosa – Bufo bufo, Common ToadRana gibbosa – Breviceps gibbosus, Cape Rain FrogRana variegata – Bombina variegata, yellow-bellied toadRana marina – Bufo marinus, cane toadRana typhonia – Trachycephalus typhoniusRana ocellata – Osteopilus ocellatusRana cornuta – Ceratophrys cornuta, Surinam horned frogRana marginata – [nomen dubium]Rana paradoxa – Pseudis paradoxa, paradoxical frogRana temporaria – Rana temporaria, Common Frog, and Rana arvalis, Moor FrogRana esculenta – Rana esculenta, Edible FrogRana arborea & Rana hyla – Hyla arborea, European tree frogRana boans – Hypsiboas boans Serpentes 

 Crotalus (rattlesnakes)Crotalus horridus – Crotalus horridusCrotalus dryinas & Crotalus durissus – Crotalus durissus Boa (boas)Boa murina & Boa scytale – Eunectes murinus, anacondaBoa canina & Boa hypnale – Corallus caninus, emerald tree boaBoa constrictor & Boa orophias – Boa constrictorBoa cenchria – Epicrates cenchriaBoa enydris & Boa hortulana – Corallus hortulanus Coluber (racers, vipers & cobras)Coluber vipera – Cerastes viperaColuber atropos – Bitis atroposColuber leberis – [suppressed]Coluber lutrix – Duberria lutrixColuber calamarius – Oligodon calamariusColuber constrictor – Coluber constrictorColuber ammodytes – Vipera ammodytesColuber cerastes – Cerastes cerastesColuber plicatilis – Pseudoeryx plicatilisColuber domicella – Liophis poecilogyrusColuber alidras – perhaps Helicops angulatusColuber buccatus – Homalopsis buccataColuber angulatus – Helicops angulatusColuber berus & Coluber chersea – Vipera berusColuber caeruleus – [nomen dubium]Coluber albus – Brachyorrhus albusColuber aspis – Vipera aspisColuber typhlus – Liophis typhlusColuber lebetinus – Macrovipera lebetinaColuber melanocephalus – Tantilla melanocephalaColuber cobella – Liophis cobellaColuber reginae – Leimadophis reginaeColuber severus – Xenodon severusColuber aurora – Lamprophis auroraColuber sipedon – Nerodia sipedon, northern water snakeColuber maurus – Natrix mauraColuber stolatus – Amphiesma stolatum, buff-striped keelbackColuber vittatus – Xenochrophis vittatus, striped keelbackColuber miliaris – Liophis miliarisColuber rhombeatus – Psammophylax rhombeatusColuber cyaneus – [nomen dubium]Coluber natrix – Natrix natrix, grass snakeColuber aesculapii & Coluber agilis – Erythrolamprus aesculapiiColuber lacteus – Homoroselaps lacteusColuber aulicus – Lycodon aulicus, Indian wolf snakeColuber monilis – [nomen dubium]Coluber pallidus – Thamnodynastes pallidusColuber lineatus – Liophis lineatusColuber naja – Naja naja, Indian cobraColuber padera – [nomen dubium]Coluber canus – Pseudaspis cana, mole snakeColuber sibilans – Psammophis sibilansColuber laticaudatus – Laticauda laticaudataColuber sirtalis – Thamnophis sirtalis, common garter snakeColuber atrox – Bothrops atroxColuber sibon & Coluber nebulatus – Sibon nebulatus, clouded snakeColuber fuscus & Coluber saturninus – Chironius fuscusColuber candidus – Bungarus candidusColuber niveus – Naja haje, Egyptian cobraColuber scaber – Dasypeltis scabra, common egg-eaterColuber carinatus – Chironius carinatus, machete savaneColuber corallinus – Liophis triscalisColuber ovivorus – perhaps Pantherophis vulpinus, fox snakeColuber exoletus – Chironius exoletusColuber situla – Zamenis situla, European ratsnakeColuber triscalis – Liophis triscalisColuber lemniscatus – Micrurus lemniscatusColuber annulatus – Leptodeira annulata, machete savaneColuber dipsas – [nomen dubium]Coluber pelias – Chrysopelea pelias, banded flying snakeColuber tyria – [nomen dubium]Coluber jugularis – Dolichophis jugularisColuber petola – Oxyrhopus petolariusColuber molurus – Python molurusColuber ahaetulla – Leptophis ahaetullaColuber petolarius – Oxyrhopus petolariusColuber haje – Naja haje, Egyptian cobraColuber filiformis – [nomen dubium]Coluber pullatus – Spilotes pullatus, tigreColuber hippocrepis – Hemorrhois hippocrepis, horseshoe whip snakeColuber minervae – Liophis lineatusColuber cinereus – perhaps Liophis cobellaColuber viridissimus – Philodryas viridissimaColuber mucosus – Ptyas mucosaColuber cenchoa – Imantodes cenchoaColuber mycterizans – Ahaetulla mycterizansColuber caerulescens – [nomen dubium]Coluber arges – [mythical]

 Anguis (slowworms & worm snakes)Anguis bipes – Scelotes bipesAnguis meleagris – Acontias meleagrisAnguis colubrina – Gongylophis colubrinus, Egyptian sand boaAnguis jaculus & Anguis cerastes – Eryx jaculus, javelin sand boaAnguis maculata – Cylindrophis maculatus, Ceylonese cylinder snakeAnguis reticulata – Typhlops reticulatus, reticulate worm snakeAnguis lumbricalis – Typhlops lumbricalis, earthworm worm snakeAnguis laticauda – [nomen dubium]Anguis scytale – Anilius scytaleAnguis eryx – part of Anguis fragilis, slowwormAnguis fragilis – Anguis fragilis, slowworm

 Amphisbaena (worm lizards)Amphisbaena fuliginosa – Amphisbaena fuliginosa, spotted worm lizardAmphisbaena alba – Amphisbaena alba, red worm lizard

 Caecilia (caecilians)Caecilia tentaculata – Caecilia tentaculataCaecilia glutinosa – Ichthyophis glutinosus, Ceylon caecilian

 Nantes 

 Petromyzon (lampreys)Petromyzon marinus – Sea LampreyPetromyzon fluviatilis & Petromyzon branchialis – European river lamprey

 Raja (rays)Raja torpedo – Common torpedoRaja batis – Common skateRaja oxyrinchus – Long-nosed burton skateRaja miraletus – Brown rayRaja fullonica – Shagreen rayRaja aquila – Common eagle rayRaja altavela – Spiny butterfly rayRaja pastinaca – Common stingrayRaja clavata – Thornback rayRaja rhinobatos – Common guitarfish

 Squalus (sharks)Squalus acanthias – Spiny dogfishSqualus centrina – Angular roughsharkSqualus spinax – Velvet belly lantern sharkSqualus squatina – AngelsharkSqualus zygaena – Smooth hammerhead sharkSqualus tiburo – Bonnethead sharkSqualus galeus – School sharkSqualus canicula & Squalus catulus – Small-spotted catsharkSqualus stellaris – NursehoundSqualus glaucus – Blue sharkSqualus carcharias – Great white sharkSqualus mustelus – Common smooth-houndSqualus pristis – Common sawfish

 Chimaera (ratfishes)Chimaera monstrosa – RabbitfishChimaera callorynchus – Elephantfish

 Lophius (anglerfishes)Lophius piscatorius – AnglerLophius vespertilio – Brazilian batfishLophius histrio – Sargassumfish

 Acipenser (sturgeons)Acipenser sturio – European Sea SturgeonAcipenser ruthenus – SterletAcipenser huso – Beluga SturgeonAcipenser plecostomus'' – Suckermouth Catfish

Notes

References

Systema Naturae
 Systema Naturae, Amphibia